Thomas Edward Alexander Stourton (born September 1987) is an English actor, voice actor, comedian and writer.

Career
Stourton started his career as a comedian at university, performing in the web-series "High Renaissance Man" that he co-wrote with Tom Palmer. After university, the pair continued to write and perform together as comedy duo, Totally Tom.

He stars alongside Charlotte Ritchie in the BBC Three sitcom Siblings which was first broadcast in summer 2014.

As of 2014, he joined the voice cast of Thomas & Friends as the voices of Duncan, Rex, Terence, Alfie (season 23 onward), and the Fat Clergyman (UK/US).

In 2015, he became one of the regular cast of CBBC's sketch comedy Horrible Histories which was first broadcast in 2015. Stourton also played a Viking nicknamed 'Lofty' in the Doctor Who episode "The Girl Who Died".

In 2018, Stourton played the role of Edward Snowden in the comedy film The Spy Who Dumped Me, featuring Mila Kunis, Kate McKinnon and Justin Theroux. That same year he began playing the recurring role of Robbie, the rival agent, across all three series of Stath Lets Flats.

In 2019, he played Percy in the comedy film Horrible Histories: The Movie – Rotten Romans, which is based on the television programme Horrible Histories.

In 2021 he co-wrote and starred in the feature film, All My Friends Hate Me. That year he also appeared in the BBC pilot Dreaming Whilst Black, guest starred in episodes of Trying, Buffering and Mood, as well as providing voices for the rebooted series of Spitting Image.

In 2022 he played various characters in Kiell Smith-Bynoe's Channel 4 Blap, Red Flag.

Filmography

Film

Television

References

External links

English male writers
English male film actors
English male voice actors
English male television actors
English male comedians
Living people
20th-century British male actors
21st-century British male actors
English male child actors
Male actors from London
1987 births